Alfonso Pérez Burrull (born 15 September 1965) is a Spanish association football referee is a former referee who officiated in the La Liga. He has been officiating since 1997, made his international debut in 2009 and retired in 2010.

Career

Burrull has been officiating in the La Liga since the 1997-1998 season and has also officiated Europa League Qualifications along with Champions League Qualifications.

He was nominated to be the Fourth Official during the 2009 UEFA Cup Final, the last UEFA Cup held.

International Games

In 2002 Burrell became an FIFA accredited international referee, however had to wait until 2009 to officiate his first game, a friendly between Australia and Ireland.

See also
 List of football referees

Notes

References

External links
 
 
 

1965 births
Living people
People from the Western Coast of Cantabria
Spanish football referees
Sportspeople from Cantabria